Aleksei Vladimirovich Volkov (born March 15, 1980) is a Russian former professional hockey goaltender.

Career 
Volkov was drafted in the third round (76th overall) of the 1998 NHL Entry Draft by the Los Angeles Kings, however never made the National Hockey League (NHL). He played most notably in the Kontinental Hockey League (KHL). He is currently serving as the General manager to Avangard Omsk of the Kontinental Hockey League (KHL).

Career statistics

International

External links

1980 births
Sportspeople from Yekaterinburg
Atlant Moscow Oblast players
Avtomobilist Yekaterinburg players
Halifax Mooseheads players
HC Dynamo Moscow players
HC MVD players
HC Spartak Moscow players
Living people
Los Angeles Kings draft picks
Lowell Lock Monsters players
New Orleans Brass players
Russian ice hockey goaltenders
Salavat Yulaev Ufa players
HC Vityaz players